Phil Fondacaro (born November 8, 1958) is an American actor and stuntman. Standing , Fondacaro is best known for his performance in the horror comedy Bordello of Blood, as well as his roles in the fantasy films The Black Cauldron, Troll, Double, Double, Toil and Trouble, and Willow. He also had several prominent television roles, such as a recurring role as Roland  on the television series Sabrina the Teenage Witch.

Career 
Fondacaro began acting in 1981, with the film Under the Rainbow. Fondacaro appeared in 1983's Return of the Jedi, the third Star Wars film, as an Ewok, the only one to have a death scene. In 1985, he voiced Creeper in Disney's The Black Cauldron. In 1986, he portrayed the invisible friend of a young Michael Gerber in the Disney Sunday movie Fuzzbucket, and also appeared in the fantasy film Troll. In 1987, he portrayed "Sir Nigel Pennyweight" in the cult horror film Ghoulies II. In the same year, he appeared as "Greaser Greg" in The Garbage Pail Kids Movie, a theatrical adaptation of the popular trading cards series, performing the character in a costume while voice actor Jim Cummings provided the voice, and he played the Devil's diminutive minion in The Yattering and Jack episode of Tales from the Darkside. In 1988's Willow, he appeared alongside Warwick Davis, one of his Star Wars co-stars.

Other prominent roles of Fondacaro's include "Hooded Dwarf" in Phantasm II, Cousin Itt in Addams Family Reunion, the villain's butler in Blood Dolls, the female vampire's "master" in the horror comedy Bordello of Blood, a shady con man in Land of the Dead, a vampire hunter in Decadent Evil, and a dramatic turn as a dwarf with an average-sized son in "A Clown's Prayer", an episode of Touched by an Angel. He also played a dwarf with an average-sized daughter in the CSI episode "A Little Murder". He also had a recurring role on Sabrina, the Teenage Witch as "Roland". He also starred in the 1993 children's film Double, Double, Toil and Trouble alongside Mary-Kate and Ashley Olsen, as Oscar.

Personal life 
Fondacaro is married to Elena Bertagnolli, who was the manager of late actor Verne Troyer. Fondacaro's brother Sal is also an actor, having appeared in Under the Rainbow, Return of the Jedi, and Invaders from Mars, all with his brother.

Filmography

Film

Television

References

External links 

1958 births
Living people
20th-century American male actors
21st-century American male actors
Actors with dwarfism
American male film actors
American male television actors
American people of Italian descent
Male actors from New Orleans